Forres golf course is a more than century-old golf course located in Forres in the northern part of Scotland on the Moray coast.
In 1889 James Braid designed and created the original nine holes, and in 1912 the course was expanded to eighteen holes by Willie Park. The 6,236-yard, par-70 course has hosted the Scottish Professional Championship tournament. The course professional is Sandy Aird, a PGA member since 1971 who has worked for the Scottish Golf Union since 1996 as North District golf coach. He is assisted by his son, Sandy Aird, Jnr.

Course layout

Feature hole
The sixteenth hole, aptly named the pond, is the feature hole of the course and requires a well-hit tee shot to avoid water and bushes. Leading up to the green is a valley just past a patch of large trees. The elevated green is protected by three bunkers and trees at the back.

External links
Forres Golf Club website
UK-golfguide.com page on Forres Golf Club

Ferres
Sports venues in Moray
Forres